Marlborough District or the Marlborough Region (or Tauihu), commonly known simply as Marlborough, is one of the 16 regions of New Zealand, located on the northeast of the South Island. Marlborough is a unitary authority, both a district and a region. Marlborough District Council is based at Blenheim, the largest town.

Marlborough is known for its dry climate, the Marlborough Sounds, and Sauvignon blanc wine. It takes its name from the earlier Marlborough Province, which was named after General The 1st Duke of Marlborough, an English general and statesman.

Geography

Marlborough's geography can be roughly divided into four sections. The south and west sections are mountainous, particularly the southern section, which rises to the peaks of the Kaikōura Ranges. These two mountainous regions are the final northern vestiges of the ranges that make up the Southern Alps, although that name is rarely applied to mountains this far north.

Between those two sections is the long straight valley of the Wairau River. This broadens to wide plains at its eastern end, in the centre of which stands the town of Blenheim. This region has fertile soil and temperate weather, which has enabled it to become the centre of the New Zealand wine industry.

The fourth geographic zone lies along its north coast. Here the drowned valleys of the Marlborough Sounds make for a convoluted and attractive coastline. The town of Picton is located at the southern end of one of the larger sounds, Queen Charlotte Sound. The town of Havelock is at the southern end of the Pelorus Sound; this sound feeds into Kenepuru Sound.

Climate
In line with most of New Zealand, the Marlborough Region has a temperate oceanic climate (Köppen Cfb) with warm summers, cool winters, and rainfall distributed across the year.

Demography 
The region is home to % of New Zealand's population.

Marlborough Region had a usual resident population of 47,340 at the 2018 New Zealand census, an increase of 3,924 people (9.0%) since the 2013 census, and an increase of 4,782 people (11.2%) since the 2006 census. There were 18,675 households. There were 23,610 males and 23,730 females, giving a sex ratio of 0.99 males per female. The median age was 45.5 years (compared with 37.4 years nationally), with 8,259 people (17.4%) aged under 15 years, 7,158 (15.1%) aged 15 to 29, 21,378 (45.2%) aged 30 to 64, and 10,548 (22.3%) aged 65 or older.

Of those at least 15 years old, 5,868 (15.0%) people had a bachelor or higher degree, and 8,454 (21.6%) people had no formal qualifications. The median income was $31,500, compared with $31,800 nationally. 5,445 people (13.9%) earned over $70,000 compared to 17.2% nationally. The employment status of those at least 15 was that 19,530 (50.0%) people were employed full-time, 6,174 (15.8%) were part-time, and 879 (2.2%) were unemployed.

Towns and settlements 

Marlborough has three towns with a population over 1,000. Together they are home to % of the region's population.

Other towns and settlements include:

 Anakiwa
 Grovetown
 Havelock
 Ngākuta Bay
 Ōkiwi Bay
 Rai Valley
 Rārangi
 Seddon
 Spring Creek
 Tuamarina
 Wairau Valley
 Ward
 Woodbourne

Culture and identity 
Ethnicities in the 2018 New Zealand census were 87.8% European/Pākehā, 13.3% Māori, 3.1% Pacific peoples, 4.1% Asian, and 2.5% other ethnicities (totals add to more than 100% since people could identify with multiple ethnicities).

The proportion of Marborough residents born overseas was 17.4%, compared with 27.1% nationally.

Although some people objected to giving their religion, 53.2% had no religion, 35.5% were Christian, 0.5% were Hindu, 0.1% were Muslim, 0.6% were Buddhist and 2.3% had other religions.

Economy

The subnational gross domestic product (GDP) of Marlborough was estimated at NZ$3.25 billion in the year to March 2019, 1.1% of New Zealand's national GDP. The regional GDP per capita was estimated at $66,277 in the same period. In the year to March 2018, primary industries contributed $650 million (21.3%) to the regional GDP, goods-producing industries contributed $1.55 billion (37.9%), service industries contributed $1.56 billion (51.2%), and taxes and duties contributed $260 million (8.6%).

Agriculture 
Marlborough has  of horticultural land as of 2017, the second-largest area in New Zealand behind Canterbury. Wine grapes make up 23,050 hectares of that area, with sweetcorn and peas being the only other crops with more than 100 hectares planted area.

Wine

The Marlborough climate has a strong contrast between hot sunny days and cool nights, which extends the ripening period of the vines. This results in more intense flavour and aroma characters in the wine. The first commercial vineyards were planted around Blenheim in 1973, and Marlborough subsequently grew to become New Zealand's largest and most internationally well-known wine-producing region. Due to this growth, particularly in the export market, the Marlborough wine region now produces three quarters of all New Zealand wine. The most important varietal is Sauvignon Blanc, which is recognised as world class; wine writers Oz Clarke and George Taber have described Marlborough's Sauvignon Blanc as the best in the world. Also important is the production of méthode traditionelle sparkling wine made from Chardonnay and Pinot Noir, which has attracted investment from large Champagne producers Mumm, Deutz, Moët & Chandon and Veuve Clicquot.

Government and defence 
The New Zealand Defence Force operates RNZAF Base Woodbourne, co-located with Woodbourne Airport west of Blenheim.

Government and politics
Marlborough is administered by a unitary authority, the Marlborough District Council. Between 1859 and 1876 Marlborough had its own provincial government, and was known as the Marlborough Province, which ended when the Abolition of the Provinces Act came into force on 1 November 1876.

The Marlborough District Council consists of a mayor and 14 councillors. The councillors are elected from three wards: seven from the Blenheim ward, three each from the Marlborough Sounds and Wairau-Awatere wards, and one from the Marlborough Māori ward. The mayor is elected at-large. Elections are held every three years in conjunction with nationwide local elections, with the next election in 2025. 

As of October 2022, the mayor and councillors are:

 Mayor: Nadine Taylor
 Councillors – Blenheim ward: Jamie Arbuckle, David Croad (deputy mayor), Deborah Dalliessi, Brian Dawson, Matt Flight, Jonathan Rosene, Thelma Sowman
 Councillors – Marlborough Sounds ward: Barbara Faulls, Raylene Innes, Ben Minehan
 Councillors – Wairau-Awatere ward: Scott Adams, Sally Arbuckle, Gerald Hope
 Councillors - Marlborough Māori Ward: Allanah Burgess

Nationally, Marlborough is part of the Kaikōura electorate, which also includes the Canterbury region north of the Ashley River / Rakahuri. For the Māori roll, Marlborough is part of the Te Tai Tonga electorate, as is the entire South Island. The electorate was first contested in the 1996 general election, the first under the new MMP voting system. From 1938 to 1996, the region was covered by the Marlborough electorate.

Marlborough is considered a safe area for the National Party, with the region held continuously by the party since the 1975 general election. Stuart Smith of the National Party has been the MP for the Kaikōura electorate since the 2014 general election. Rino Tirikatene of the Labour Party is the MP for the Te Tai Tonga electorate.

A combined District and High Court at Blenheim serves the region judicially.

Transport 
Marlborough is served by four state highways: State Highway 1, State Highway 62, and State Highway 63. State Highway 1 is the main highway in the region, connecting Picton and Blenheim, and connecting the region south to Christchurch via Seddon and Kaikoura. State Highway 6 connects Blenheim and Renwick, and connects the region to Nelson and Tasman via Havelock. State Highway 63 leaves State Highway 6 at Renwick and travels via the Wairau Valley and Saint Arnaud to meet SH 6 again at Kawatiri, providing a direct route to the West Coast and bypassing Nelson. State Highway 62 is a short highway linking SH 1 at Spring Creek with SH 6 north of Renwick, providing a direct route between Picton and Nelson and bypassing Blenheim.

The Main North Line railway serves the region, running roughly parallel so State Highway 1. The first section of the line in Marlborough opened on 18 November 1875 between Blenheim and Picton. The line south of Blenheim opened to Seddon in October 1902, to Ward in April 1911, and to Wharanui in December 1915. The line finally opened across the present-day Marlborough border in October 1942 when the line was extended to Clarence. The entire line through to Christchurch opened on 15 December 1945 when the railheads met at Kaikoura. Today, the line is used by the Coastal Pacific passenger train, which operates one return journey per day during the summer months. The line is also heavily used by freight trains between Christchurch and the Cook Strait rail ferry at Picton.

Woodbourne Airport (trading as Marlborough Airport) is the region's main airport. Air New Zealand Link operates flights from Woodbourne to Auckland and Wellington and Sounds Air operates flights from Woodbourne to Wellington and Christchurch Airport. Sounds Air also operates flights from Picton Aerodrome to Wellington.

Port Marlborough at Picton is the region's main seaport. Interislander and Bluebridge both operate roll-on-roll-off ferry services between Picton and Wellington.

Education 

There are 29 primary and secondary schools in Marlborough. There are 22 state primary schools, one state intermediate school (Bohally Intermediate in Blenheim), three state secondary schools (Marlborough Boys' College and Marlborough Girls' College in Blenheim, and Queen Charlotte College in Picton), and one state area school (Rai Valley Area School). There are two state-integrated schools, one Catholic primary school and one Christian composite school, both in Blenheim.

References

External links

 
 Marlborough District Council
 Discover Marlborough: The Marlborough Web Directory
 Marlborough Online

 
Territorial authorities of New Zealand